Viktor Aleksandrovich Butenko (born 10 March 1993) is a Russian track and field athlete competing in the discus throw. He represented the host nation at the 2013 World Championships in Athletics in Moscow, finishing eighth. He was born in Stavropol.

He was a finalist at the 2014 European Athletics Championships, placing fifth. Among his other honours are a win at the European Cup Winter Throwing at a bronze at the European Team Championships in 2014.

He was the winner at the Russian Athletics Championships in 2016. However, he was suspended from international competition in 2016 due to an overarching ban on the All-Russia Athletic Federation as a response to doping.

International competitions

National titles
Russian Athletics Championships
Discus throw: 2016

References

External links

Living people
1993 births
Sportspeople from Stavropol
Russian male discus throwers
World Athletics Championships athletes for Russia
Authorised Neutral Athletes at the World Athletics Championships
Russian Athletics Championships winners